Mangarjung Tea Garden (Nagri) is a census town  in the Jorebunglow Sukhiapokhri CD block in the Darjeeling Sadar subdivision of the Darjeeling district in the state of West Bengal, India.

Geography

Location                                                   

Area overview
The map alongside shows a part of the southern portion of the Darjeeling Himalayan hill region  in the Darjeeling district. In the Darjeeling Sadar subdivision 61.00% of the total population lives in the rural areas and 39.00% of the population lives in the urban areas. In the Mirik subdivision 80.11% of the total population lives in the rural areas and 19.89% lives in the urban areas. There are 78 tea gardens/ estates (the figure varies slightly according to different sources), in the district, producing and largely exporting Darjeeling tea. It engages a large proportion of the population directly/ indirectly. Some tea gardens were identified in the 2011 census as census towns or villages. Such places are marked in the map as CT (census town) or R (rural/ urban centre). Specific tea estate pages are marked TE.

Note: The map alongside presents some of the notable locations in the subdivision. All places marked in the map are linked in the larger full screen map.

Demographics
According to the 2011 Census of India, Mangarjung Tea Garden (Nagri) had a total population of 5,644 of which 2,758 (49%) were males and 2,886 (51%) were females. There were 490 persons in the age range of 0 to 6 years. The total number of literate people in Mangarjung Tea Garden was 4,090 (72.47% of the population over 6 years).

Infrastructure
According to the District Census Handbook 2011, Darjiling, Mangarjung Tea Garden (Nagri) covered an area of 5.524 km2. Among the civic amenities, the protected water supply involved overhead tank and spring. It had 400 domestic electric connections. Among the medical facilities it had 1 medicine shop. Among the educational facilities it had were 7 primary schools, 1 middle school, the nearest secondary and senior secondary schools at Nagri Tea Estate 3 km away. It had 16 non-formal education centres (Sarva Siksha Abhiyan). An important commodity it manufactured was tea.

Economy

DOTEPL group
The gardens of the Darjeeling Organic Tea Estates Private Ltd. are: Ambootia, Changtong, Happy Valley, Monteviot, Moondakotee, Mullootar, Nagri, Noorbong, Sepoydhurah (Chamling), Sivitar, Rangmook Ceder, Rangaroon, Pandam and Aloobari.

Education
Indira Ojha High School is an English-medium coeducational institution established in 1986. It has facilities for teaching from class V to class X.

References

Cities and towns in Darjeeling district